Andy Wilson (1902 – 21 April 1926) was a British cyclist. He competed in two events at the 1924 Summer Olympics.

References

External links
 

1902 births
1926 deaths
British male cyclists
Olympic cyclists of Great Britain
Cyclists at the 1924 Summer Olympics
Place of birth missing